The 1958 United States House of Representatives elections in South Carolina were held on November 4, 1958, to select six Representatives for two-year terms from the state of South Carolina.  The primary election in the 2nd congressional district was held on June 10.  All six incumbents were re-elected and the composition of the state delegation remained solely Democratic.

1st congressional district
Incumbent Democratic Congressman L. Mendel Rivers of the 1st congressional district, in office since 1941, was unopposed in his bid for re-election.

General election results

|-
| 
| colspan=5 |Democratic hold
|-

2nd congressional district
Incumbent Democratic Congressman John J. Riley of the 2nd congressional district, in office since 1951, defeated E.B. Linder in the Democratic primary and was unopposed in the general election.

Democratic primary

General election results

|-
| 
| colspan=5 |Democratic hold
|-

3rd congressional district
Incumbent Democratic Congressman William Jennings Bryan Dorn of the 3rd congressional district, in office since 1951, was unopposed in his bid for re-election.

General election results

|-
| 
| colspan=5 |Democratic hold
|-

4th congressional district
Incumbent Democratic Congressman Robert T. Ashmore of the 4th congressional district, in office since 1953, was unopposed in his bid for re-election.

General election results

|-
| 
| colspan=5 |Democratic hold
|-

5th congressional district
Incumbent Democratic Congressman Robert W. Hemphill of the 5th congressional district, in office since 1957, was unopposed in his bid for re-election.

General election results

|-
| 
| colspan=5 |Democratic hold
|-

6th congressional district
Incumbent Democratic Congressman John L. McMillan of the 6th congressional district, in office since 1939, was unopposed in his bid for re-election.

General election results

|-
| 
| colspan=5 |Democratic hold
|-

See also
United States House of Representatives elections, 1958
South Carolina gubernatorial election, 1958
South Carolina's congressional districts

References

1958
South Carolina
United States House of Representatives